This is a list of Los Angeles Historic-Cultural Monuments on the East and Northeast Sides of the city of Los Angeles, California, in the United States. There are more than 140 Los Angeles Historic-Cultural Monuments (LAHCM) in this area. It includes the communities of Boyle Heights, Highland Park, Eagle Rock, Lincoln Heights, Mt. Washington, Hermon, Garvanza and Montecito Heights. They are designated by the City's Cultural Heritage Commission.

Current and former Historic-Cultural Monuments

Non-HCM historic sites recognized by state and nation

See also

Lists of L.A. Historic-Cultural Monuments
 Historic-Cultural Monuments in Downtown Los Angeles

 Historic-Cultural Monuments in the Harbor area
 Historic-Cultural Monuments in Hollywood
 Historic-Cultural Monuments in the San Fernando Valley
 Historic-Cultural Monuments in Silver Lake, Angelino Heights, and Echo Park
 Historic-Cultural Monuments in South Los Angeles
 Historic-Cultural Monuments on the Westside
 Historic-Cultural Monuments in the Wilshire and Westlake areas

Other
 City of Los Angeles' Historic Preservation Overlay Zones
 National Register of Historic Places listings in Los Angeles
 National Register of Historic Places listings in Los Angeles County
 List of California Historical Landmarks

References

External links
 official Designated L.A. Historic-Cultural Monuments (LAHCM) website — with 'ever-updated' LAHCM list via PDF link.
 Los Angeles HCM Report for Boyle Heights  — L.A. Planning Department.
 Los Angeles HCM Report for the Northeast area
 City of Los Angeles Map, with community districts. — via Given Place Media.
 Big Orange Landmarks: "Exploring the Landmarks of Los Angeles, One Monument at a Time" — L.A.H.C.Monuments in Northeast Los Angeles — online photos and in-depth history. — website curator: Floyd B. Bariscale
 Big Orange Landmarks: "Exploring the Landmarks of Los Angeles, One Monument at a Time" — L.A.H.C.Monuments in Boyle Heights.
 Big Orange Landmarks: "Exploring the Landmarks of Los Angeles, One Monument at a Time" — L.A.H.C.Monuments in Southeast Los Angeles.

 

East
Los Angeles-related lists